So What is an acoustic jazz album by American musicians Jerry Garcia and David Grisman. It was released on the Acoustic Disc record label in August 1998.

Track listing
 "So What" (Miles Davis) – 6:55
 "Bag's Groove" (Milt Jackson) – 8:43
 "Milestones" (Davis) – 7:55
 "16/16" (David Grisman) – 6:18
 "So What" (Davis) – 7:51
 "Bag's Groove" (Jackson) – 8:22
 "Milestones" (Davis) – 10:18
 "So What" (Davis) – 7:40

Personnel

Musicians
Jerry Garcia - guitar
David Grisman - mandolin
Jim Kerwin - bass
Joe Craven - percussion
Matt Eakle - flute (tracks 2 and 4)

Production
David Grisman – producer
Craig Miller – executive producer
David Dennison – recording, mixing
Paul Stubblebine – mastering
Alice G. Patterson – back cover photograph
D. Brent Houseman – layout and design
Jerry Garcia – original artwork

References

1998 albums
Acoustic Disc albums
David Grisman albums
Jerry Garcia albums
Collaborative albums